The Pulpit is a  elevation Navajo Sandstone pillar located in Zion National Park, in Washington County of southwest Utah, United States. It is a photographic icon seen from the parking area at the end of Zion Canyon Scenic Drive, and the entrance to The Narrows. Neighbors include Mountain of Mystery to the north, Observation Point to the southeast, Angels Landing and The Organ to the south, and Cathedral Mountain to the southwest. The first ascent was made April 15, 1967, by Fred Beckey, Eric Bjornstad, Hal Woodworth, Pat Callis, and Galen Rowell.

Climate
Spring and fall are the most favorable seasons to view or climb The Pulpit. According to the Köppen climate classification system, it is located in a Cold semi-arid climate zone, which is defined by the coldest month having an average mean temperature below , and at least 50% of the total annual precipitation being received during the spring and summer.

See also
 Geology of the Zion and Kolob canyons area
 Colorado Plateau

Gallery

References

External links
 Zion National Park National Park Service
 Localized weather forecast
 The Pulpit rock climbing: Mountainproject.com

Zion National Park
Landforms of Washington County, Utah
Sandstone formations of the United States
Colorado Plateau